Keith Loach (born in Calgary, Alberta) is a Canadian skeleton racer who has competed since 2005. His best World Cup finish was eighth at St. Moritz, Switzerland in January 2009.

References

External links
 

1975 births
Living people
Canadian male skeleton racers
Sportspeople from Calgary